Behind the Scenes is a 1914 American silent drama film produced by Famous Players-Lasky, released by Paramount Pictures, based on the play Behind the Scenes by Margaret Mayo, and starring Mary Pickford as a struggling young actress. James Kirkwood directed and co-starred.

Cast
Mary Pickford as Dolly Lane
James Kirkwood as Steve Hunter
Lowell Sherman as Teddy Harrington
Ida Waterman as Mrs. Harrington
Russell Bassett as Joe Canby

Preservation status
A print is in the George Eastman House Motion Picture Collection.

References

External links

1914 films
American silent feature films
American films based on plays
Paramount Pictures films
Films directed by James Kirkwood Sr.
1914 drama films
American black-and-white films
Silent American drama films
1910s American films